Lalganj is a constituency of the Uttar Pradesh Legislative Assembly covering the city of Lalganj in the Azamgarh district of Uttar Pradesh, India.

Lalganj is one of five assembly constituencies in the Lalganj Lok Sabha constituency. Since 2008, this assembly constituency is numbered 351 amongst 403 constituencies.

Election results

2022

2017
Bahujan Samaj Party candidate Azad Ari Mardan won in last Assembly election of 2017 Uttar Pradesh Legislative Elections defeating Bharatiya Janta Party candidate Daroga Prasad Saroj by a margin of 2,227 votes.

Members of Legislative Assembly

References

External links
 

Assembly constituencies of Uttar Pradesh
Politics of Azamgarh district